Soraya is the eponymous fourth bilingual studio album by Colombian-American singer-songwriter Soraya, released on May 6, 2003 by EMI Music. The album won the "Best Album by Songwriter" in the 2004 Latin Grammy Award.

Track listing

Soraya (International Version/English Version)

References

2003 albums
Soraya (musician) albums